The economy of Venezuela is based primarily on petroleum, making the country the 25th largest producer of oil in the world and the 8th largest member of OPEC. Venezuela also manufactures and exports heavy industry products such as steel, aluminum, and cement. Other notable manufacturing includes electronics and automobiles as well as beverages and foodstuffs. Agriculture in Venezuela accounts for approximately 4.7% of GDP, 7.3% of the labor force and at least one-fourth of Venezuela's land area. Venezuela exports rice, corn, fish, tropical fruit, coffee, pork and beef. Venezuela has an estimated USD$14.3 trillion worth of natural resources and is not self-sufficient in most areas of agriculture. Exports accounted for 16.7% of GDP and petroleum products accounted for about 95% of those exports.

Since the 1920s, Venezuela has been a rentier state, offering oil as its main export. From the 1950s to the early 1980s, the Venezuelan economy experienced a steady growth that attracted many immigrants, with the nation enjoying the highest standard of living in Latin America. 

However, this situation was reversed when oil prices collapsed during the 1980s. Since the Bolivarian Revolution half-dismantled its PDVSA oil giant corporation in 2002 by firing most of its 20,000-strong dissident professional human capital and imposed stringent currency controls in 2003 in an attempt to prevent capital flight, there has been a decline in oil production and exports and a series of stern currency devaluations.

Further yet, price controls, expropriation of numerous farmlands and various industries, among other disputable government policies including a near-total freeze on any access to foreign currency at reasonable "official" exchange rates, have resulted in severe shortages in Venezuela and steep price rises of all common goods, including food, water, household products, spare parts, tools and medical supplies; forcing many manufacturers to either cut production or close down, with many ultimately abandoning the country as has been the case with several technological firms and most automobile makers. 

Venezuela's economy has been in a state of total economic collapse since 2013. In 2015, Venezuela had over 100% inflation—the highest in the world and the highest in the country's history at that time. According to independent sources, the rate increased to 80,000% at the end of 2018 with Venezuela spiraling into hyperinflation while the poverty rate was nearly 90 percent of the population. On 14 November 2017, credit rating agencies declared that Venezuela was in default with its debt payments, with Standard & Poor's categorizing Venezuela as being in "selective default".

The United States has been Venezuela's most important trading partner despite the strained relations between the two countries. American exports to Venezuela have included machinery, agricultural products, medical instruments and cars. Venezuela is one of the top four suppliers of foreign oil to the United States. About 500 American companies are represented in Venezuela. 

According to the Central Bank of Venezuela, between 1998 and 2008 the government received around US$325 billion through oil production and exports in general.[17] According to the International Energy Agency (as of August 2015), the production of 2.4 million barrels per day supplied 500,000 barrels to the United States.[18]

A report published by Transparencia Venezuela in 2022 estimated that illegal activities in the country made up around 21% of its GDP.

History

1922–1959 
After oil was discovered in Venezuela in 1922 during the Maracaibo strike, Venezuela's dictator Juan Vicente Gómez allowed American oil companies to write Venezuela's petroleum law. In 1943, Standard Oil of New Jersey accepted a new agreement in Venezuela based on the 50–50 principle, described as "a landmark event". Even more favorable terms were negotiated in 1945, after a coup brought to power a left-leaning government that included Juan Pablo Pérez Alfonso.

From the 1950s to the early 1980s, the Venezuelan economy, which was buoyed by high oil prices, was one of the strongest and most prosperous in South America. The continuous growth during that period attracted many immigrants.

In 1958, a new government, again including Pérez Alfonso, devised a plan for an international oil cartel, that would become OPEC. In 1973, Venezuela voted to nationalize its oil industry effective 1 January 1976, with Petróleos de Venezuela (PDVSA) presiding over a number of holding companies. In subsequent years, Venezuela built a vast refining and marketing system in the United States and Europe.

During Pérez Jiménez' dictatorship from 1952 to 1958, Venezuela enjoyed remarkably high GDP growth, so that in the late 1950s Venezuela's real GDP per capita almost reached that of Ireland or West Germany. Albeit, West Germany was still recovering from WW2 destruction of German infrastructure. In 1950, Venezuela was the world's 4th wealthiest nation per capita. However, Rómulo Betancourt (President from 1959 to 1964) inherited from 1958 to 1959 onward an enormous internal and external debt caused by rampant public spending. He managed to balance Venezuela's public budget and initiate an unsuccessful agrarian reform.

1960s–1990s 

Buoyed by a strong oil sector in the 1960s and 1970s, Venezuela's governments were able to maintain social harmony by spending fairly large amounts on public programs including health care, education, transport and food subsidies. Literacy and welfare programs benefited tremendously from these conditions. Because of the oil wealth, Venezuelan workers "enjoyed the highest wages in Latin America". This situation was reversed when oil prices collapsed during the 1980s.

With the price collapse, the economy contracted and inflation levels (consumer price inflation) rose, remaining between 6 and 12% from 1982 to 1986. The inflation rate peaked in 1989 at 84%, the year the capital city of Caracas suffered from rioting during the Caracazo following the cut of government spending and the opening of markets by President Carlos Andrés Pérez. After Pérez initiated such liberal economic policies and made Venezuelan markets more free, Venezuela's GDP went from a −8.3% decline in 1989 to growing 4.4% in 1990 and 9.2% in 1991, though wages remained low and unemployment was high among Venezuelans.

Overreliance on oil prices and a fractured political system without parties agreeing on policies caused many of the problems. By the mid-1990s, Venezuela under President Rafael Caldera saw annual inflation rates of 50–60% from 1993 to 1997, with the country suffering a severe banking crisis. In 1998, the economic crisis had grown even worse. Per capita GDP was at the same level as 1963 (after adjusting 1963 dollar to 1998 value), down a third from its 1978 peak; and the purchasing power of the average salary was a third of its 1978 level.

1999–2013 

Hugo Chávez was elected President in December 1998 and took office in February 1999. In 2000, oil prices soared, offering Chávez funds not seen since Venezuela's economic collapse in the 1980s. Chávez then used economic policies that were more social democratic than those of his predecessors, using populist approaches with oil funds that made Venezuela's economy more dependent on high oil prices.

In the first four years of the Chávez presidency, the economy grew at first (1999–2001), then contracted from 2001–2003 to GDP levels similar to 1997. At first, the economic decline was due to low oil prices, but it was fueled by the turmoil of the 2002 coup attempt and the 2002–2003 general strike. Other factors of the decline were an exodus of capital from the country and a reluctance of foreign investors. GDP was 50.0 trillion bolívares in 1998. At the bottom of the recession in 2003, it was 42.4 trillion bolívares (in constant 1998 bolívares). However, GDP rebounded 50.1 trillion bolívares with a calmer political situation in 2004 and rose to 66.1 trillion bolívares in 2007 (both in constant 1998 bolívares).

The hardest-hit sectors in the worst recession years (2002–2003) were construction (−55.9%), petroleum (−26.5%), commerce (−23.6%) and manufacturing (−22.5%). The drop in the petroleum sector was caused by adherence to the OPEC quota established in 2002 and the virtual cessation of exports during the PdVSA-led general strike of 2002–2003. The non-petroleum sector of the economy contracted by 6.5% in 2002. The bolívar, which had been suffering from serious inflation and devaluation relative to international standards since the late 1980s, continued to weaken.

The inflation rate as measured by consumer price index was 35.8% in 1998, falling to a low of 12.5% in 2001 and rising to 31.1% in 2003. Historically, the highest yearly inflation was 100% in 1996. In an attempt to support the bolívar, bolster the government's declining level of international reserves and mitigate the adverse impact from the oil industry work stoppage on the financial system, the Ministry of Finance and the central bank suspended foreign exchange trading on 23 January 2003. On 6 February, the government created CADIVI, a currency control board charged with handling foreign exchange procedures. The board set the US$ exchange rate at 1,596 bolívares to the dollar for purchases and 1,600 to the dollar for sales.

The housing market in Venezuela shrunk significantly with developers avoiding Venezuela due to the massive number of companies who have had their property expropriated by the government. According to The Heritage Foundation and The Wall Street Journal, Venezuela had the weakest property rights in the world, scoring only 5.0 on a scale of 100, with expropriation without compensation being common. The shortage of housing is so significant that in 2007 a group of squatters occupied Centro Financiero Confinanzas, a cancelled economic center that was supposed to symbolize Venezuela's growing economy.

The Venezuelan economy shrank 5.8% in the first three months of 2010 compared to the same period of 2009 and had the highest inflation rate in Latin America at 30.5%. President Chávez expressed optimism that Venezuela would emerge from recession despite the International Monetary Fund (IMF) forecasts showing that Venezuela would be the only country in the region to remain in recession that year. The IMF qualified the economic recovery of Venezuela as "delayed and weak" in comparison with other countries of the region. Following Chavez's death in early 2013, Venezuela's economy continued to fall into an even greater recession.

2013–present 

According to the misery index in 2013, Venezuela ranked as the top spot globally with the highest misery index score. The International Finance Corporation ranked Venezuela one of the lowest countries for doing business with, ranking it 180 of 185 countries for its Doing Business 2013 report with protecting investors and taxes being its worst rankings. In early 2013, the bolívar fuerte was devalued due to growing shortages in Venezuela. The shortages included necessities such as toilet paper, milk and flour. Shortages also affected healthcare in Venezuela, with the University of Caracas Medical Hospital ceasing to perform surgeries due to the lack of supplies in 2014. The Bolivarian government's policies also made it difficult to import drugs and other medical supplies. Due to such complications, many Venezuelans died avoidable deaths with medical professionals having to use limited resources using methods that were replaced decades ago.

In 2014, Venezuela entered an economic recession having its GDP growth decline to −3.0%. Venezuela was placed at the top of the misery index for the second year in a row. The Economist said Venezuela was "probably the world's worst-managed economy". Citibank believed that "the economy has little prospect of improvement" and that the state of the Venezuelan economy was a "disaster". The Doing Business 2014 report by the International Finance Corporation and the World Bank ranked Venezuela one score lower than the previous year, then 181 out of 185. The Heritage Foundation ranked Venezuela 175th out of 178 countries in economic freedom for 2014, classifying it as a "repressed" economy according to the principles the foundation advocates. According to Foreign Policy, Venezuela was ranked last in the world on its Base Yield Index due to low returns that investors receive when investing in Venezuela. In a 2014 report titled Scariest Places on the Business Frontiers by Zurich Financial Services and reported by Bloomberg, Venezuela was ranked as the riskiest emerging market in the world. Many companies such as Toyota, Ford Motor Co., General Motors Company, Air Canada, Air Europa, American Airlines, Copa Airlines, TAME, TAP Airlines and United Airlines slowed or stopped operation due to the lack of hard currency in the country, with Venezuela owing such foreign companies billions of dollars. Venezuela also dismantled CADIVI, a government body in charge of currency exchange. CADIVI was known for holding money from the private sector and was suspected to be corrupt.

Venezuela again topped the misery index according to the World Bank in 2015. The IMF predicted in October 2015 an inflation rate of 159% for the year 2015—the highest rate in Venezuelan history and the highest rate in the world—and that the economy would contract by 10%. According to leaked documents from the Central Bank of Venezuela, the country ended 2015 with an inflation rate of 270% and a shortage rate of goods over 70%.

President Nicolás Maduro reorganized his economic cabinet in 2016 with the group mainly consisting of leftist Venezuelan academics. According to Bank of America's investment division Merrill Lynch, Maduro's new cabinet was expected to tighten currency and price controls in the country. Alejandro Werner, the head of IMF's Latin American Department, stated that 2015 figures released by the Central Bank of Venezuela were not accurate and that Venezuela's inflation for 2015 was 275%. Other forecast inflation figures by IMF and Bank of America were 720% and 1,000% in 2016, Analysts believed that the Venezuelan government has been manipulating economic statistics, especially since they did not report adequate data since late 2014. According to economist Steve Hanke of Johns Hopkins University, the Central Bank of Venezuela delayed the release of statistics and lied about figures much like the Soviet Union did, with Hanke saying that a lie coefficient had to be used to observe Venezuela's economic data.

By 2016, media outlets said that Venezuela was suffering an economic collapse with the IMF saying that it expected it to reach a 500% inflation rate and 10% contraction in the GDP. In December 2016, monthly inflation exceeded 50 percent for the 30th consecutive day, meaning the Venezuelan economy was officially experiencing hyperinflation, making it the 57th country to be added to the Hanke-Krus World Hyperinflation Table.

On 25 August 2017, it was reported that new United States sanctions against Venezuela did not ban trading of the country's existing non-government bonds, with the sanctions instead including restrictions intended to block the government's ability to fund itself.

On 26 January 2018, the government ended the protected, subsidized fixed exchange rate mechanism that was highly overvalued as a result of rampant inflation. The National Assembly (led by the opposition) said inflation in 2017 was over 4,000%, a level other independent economists also agreed with. In February, the government launched an oil-backed cryptocurrency called the petro.

Bloomberg's Cafe Con Leche Index calculated the price increase for a cup of coffee to have increased by 718% in the 12 weeks before 18 January 2018, an annualized inflation rate of 448,000%. The finance commission of the National Assembly noted in July 2018 that prices were doubling every 28 days with an annualized inflation rate of 25,000%.

The country was heading for a selective default in 2017. In early 2018, the country was in default, meaning it could not pay its lenders.

24 August 2017 President Trump imposed sanctions on the state debt of Venezuela which ban to make transactions with state debt of Venezuela including the participation in debt restructuring.
13 November 2017 the technical default period ended and Venezuela did not pay coupons on its dollar eurobonds. This caused a cross default on other dollar bonds. 30 November ISDA committee consisting of 15 biggest banks admitted default on state debt obligations what in its turn entailed payments on CDS. According to Cbonds, nowadays there are 20 international Venezuelan bonds which are recognized in default. The overall amount of defaulted obligations is equal to 36 billion dollars.

A report published by Transparencia Venezuela in 2022 estimated that illegal activities in the country made up around 21% of its GDP. According to the report, drug, oil and gold trafficking, as well as illegal activities in ports and customs had generated over 9.4 billion dollars for organized crime protected by corrupt officials. In 2021, gold extraction generated around 2.3 billion dollars, of which the State received only 25%.

Sectors 
Under the tenures of Hugo Chávez and his successor Nicolás Maduro, many businesses abandoned Venezuela. In 1999, there were 13,000 companies in the country. By 2016, less than a third of companies remained in Venezuela, with only 4,000 companies operating in the nation.

Petroleum and other resources 

Venezuela has the world's largest proven oil reserves, totaling 302.81 billion barrels at the end of 2017. The country is a major producer of petroleum products, which remain the keystone of the Venezuelan economy. The International Energy Agency shows how Venezuela's oil production has fallen in the last years, producing only  daily, down from 3.5 million in 1998. However, the oil incomes will double its value in local currency with the recent currency devaluation. Venezuela has large energy subsidies. In 2015, the cost of petrol was just US$0.06 per gallon, costing 23% of government revenues. In February 2016, the government finally decided to raise the price, but only to 6 bolívar (about 60¢ at the official rate of exchange) per litre for premium and just 1 bolívar (10¢) for lower-grade petrol.

A range of other natural resources, including iron ore, coal, bauxite, gold, nickel and diamonds, are in various stages of development and production. In April 2000, Venezuela's president decreed a new mining law and regulations were adopted to encourage greater private sector participation in mineral extraction. During Venezuela's economic crisis, the rate of gold excavated fell 64.1% between February 2013 and February 2014 and iron production dropped 49.8%. In the production of gold, until 2009 the country produced an annual average between 11 and 12 tons per year. After that, due to the political and economic problems, mining activity plummeted: in 2017 the country only extracted 0.48 ton. 

Venezuela mostly utilizes hydropower resources to supply power to the nation's industries, accounting for 57% of total consumption at the end of 2016. However, persistent drought has severely reduced energy production from hydropower resources. The national electricity law is designed to provide a legal framework and to encourage competition and new investment in the sector. After a two-year delay, the government is proceeding with plans to privatize the various state-owned electricity systems under a different scheme than previously envisioned.

Manufacturing 

Manufacturing contributed 12% of GDP in 2014. The manufacturing sector is experiencing severe difficulties, amidst lack of investment and accusations of mismanagement. Venezuela manufactures and exports steel, aluminum, transport equipment, textiles, apparel, beverages and foodstuffs. It produces cement, tires, paper, fertilizer and assembles cars both for domestic and export markets.

In 2014, General Motors Venezolana stopped automotive production after 65 years of service due to a lack of supplies while the Central Bank of Venezuela announced that the shortage rate of new automobiles was at 100%. By the first half of 2016, only 10 vehicles were manufactured per day in Venezuela with production dropping 86%.

In 2017, estimates showed that Venezuela's industrial production fell about 2%.

Agriculture 

Agriculture in Venezuela accounts for approximately 3% of GDP, 10% of the labor force, and at least a quarter of Venezuela's land area. Venezuela exports rice, corn, fish, tropical fruit, coffee, beef and pork. The country is not self-sufficient in most areas of agriculture. Venezuela imports about two-thirds of its food needs. In 2002, American firms exported $347 million worth of agricultural products, including wheat, corn, soybeans, soybean meal, cotton, animal fats, vegetable oils and other items to make Venezuela one of the top two American markets in South America. The United States supplies more than one-third of Venezuela's food imports. Recent government policies have led to problems with food shortages.

Venezuela produced in 2019:

 4.3 million tons of sugarcane;
 1.9 million tons of maize;
 1.4 million tons of banana;
 760 thousand tons of rice;
 485 thousand tons of pineapple;
 477 thousand tons of potato;
 435 thousand tons of palm oil;
 421 thousand tons of cassava;
 382 thousand tons of orange;
 225 thousand tons of watermelon;
 199 thousand tons of papaya;
 194 thousand tons of melon;
 182 thousand tons of tomatoes;
 155 thousand tons of tangerine;
 153 thousand tons of coconut;
 135 thousand tons of avocado;
 102 thousand tons of mango (including mangosteen and guava);
 56 thousand tons of coffee;

In addition to smaller productions of other agricultural products. Due to internal economic and political problems, sugar cane production dropped from 7.3 million tons in 2012 to 3.6 million in 2016. Corn production dropped from 2.3 million tons in 2014 to 1.2 million in 2017. Rice fell from 1.15 million tons in 2014 to 498 thousand tons in 2016.

Livestock 

In livestock, Venezuela produced, in 2019: 470 thousand tons of beef, 454 thousand tons of chicken meat, 129 thousand tons of pork, 1.7 billion liters of cow's milk, among others. The production of chicken meat decreased progressively, from year to year, from 1.1 million tons in 2011 to 448 thousand tons in 2017. The production of pork fell from 219 thousand tons in 2011 to 124 thousand tons in 2018. The production of cow's milk dropped from 2.4 billion liters in 2011 to 1.7 billion in 2019.

Trade 

Venezuela is a founding member of the Organization of the Petroleum Exporting Countries (OPEC), the Organization of Gas Exporting Countries (GECF), the Bolivarian Alliance for the Peoples of Our America (ALBA) and the Community of Latin American and Caribbean States (CELAC). Petroleum constitutes 80% of Venezuela's exports with a value of $22.2 billion in 2017. Thanks to petroleum exports, Venezuela usually posts a trade surplus. From 2005, nontraditional (i.e. nonpetroleum) private sector exports have been declining rapidly. By 2015, they constitute 8% of total exports. The United States is Venezuela's leading trade partner. During 2002, the United States exported $4.4 billion in goods to Venezuela, making it the 25th-largest market for the United States Including petroleum products, Venezuela exported $15.1 billion in goods to the United States, making it its 14th-largest source of goods. Venezuela opposes the proposed Free Trade Area of the Americas.

Since 1998, China–Venezuela relations have seen an increasing partnership between the government of the Venezuelan President Hugo Chávez and the People's Republic of China. Sino-Venezuelan trade was less than $500m per year before 1999 and reached $7.5bn in 2009, making China Venezuela's second-largest trade partner and Venezuela China's biggest investment destination in Latin America. Various bilateral deals have seen China invest billions in Venezuela and Venezuela increase exports of oil and other resources to China. China has demanded payment in oil for its exports to Venezuela because of its unwillingness to accept Venezuelan currency and the inability of Venezuela to pay in dollars or gold.

Labor 

Under Chávez, Venezuela has also instituted worker-run "co-management" initiatives in which workers' councils play a key role in the management of a plant or factory. In experimental co-managed enterprises, such as the state-owned Alcasa factory, workers develop budgets and elect both managers and departmental delegates who work together with company executives on technical issues related to production.

In November 2010, workers spent a week protesting outside factories in Valera and Valencia following the expropriation of the American bottle-maker Owens-Illinois.

Labor disputes have continued to increase since the financial crisis in 2008. According to the World Economic Forum, Venezuela is ranked as 134th of the 148 countries for economic competitiveness. Many in the private sector attribute these findings to the inflexible labor market.

In recent years, a barrage of pro-worker decrees have been passed. The most significant could be the 2012 labor laws known as the LOTTT. These laws included the virtual ban on dismissal, shorter work week, improved holidays and enhanced maternity benefits. The LOTTT offers job security to most workers after the first month. Employers have reported an absenteeism rate of up to 40% which they blame on the leniency of these labor laws. As expected, employers have been less willing to recruit.

On 17 November 2014, President Maduro issued a decree to increase the minimum salary for all workers by 15%. The decree became effective on 1 December 2014. As part of the May Day celebrations in honor of workers' day, President Maduro announced on 28 April 2015 that the minimum wage would increase 30%; 20% in May and 10% in July, with the newly announced minimum wage for Venezuelans being only about $30 per month at the widely used black market rate.

In September 2017, the National Union of Workers (UNETE) announced that Venezuela had lost 3,345,000 jobs since the election of President Maduro. By December 2017, the number of lost jobs increased by 400,000 to over 3,850,000 lost jobs since the start of Maduro's tenure.

Infrastructure 
In the 20th century when Venezuela benefitted from oil sales, infrastructure flourished in Venezuela. However, in recent years Venezuela's public services and infrastructure has suffered, especially utilities such as electricity and water.

Transportation 
Venezuela has an extensive road system that was initially created in the 1960s helped aid the oil and aluminum industries. The capital Caracas had a modern subway system designed by the French that was finished in 1995, with the subway tunneling more than 31.6 mi (51 km).

In 1870, Antonio Guzmán Blanco helped create Venezuela's railway system.

The network is being built in cooperation with China Railways, which is also cooperating with Venezuela to create factories for tracks, railway cars and eventually locomotives. However, Venezuela's rail project is being put on hold due to Venezuela not being able to pay the $7.5 billion and owing China Railway nearly $500 million.

Lufthansa said it would stop all flights to Venezuela on 18 June 2016, citing difficulties with currency controls. Other airlines also cut back on flights and required that passengers pay fares in US$.

Energy 

The Venezuelan electrical grid is plagued with occasional blackouts in various districts of the country. In 2011, it had so many problems that rations on electricity were put in place to help ease blackouts. On 3 September 2013, 70% of the country plunged into darkness with 14 of 23 states of Venezuela stating they did not have electricity for most of the day. Another power outage on 2 December 2013 left most of Venezuela in the dark again and happened just days before elections.

Energy statistics 
 Electricity – production by source:
 Fossil fuel: 35.7% (2012 est.)
 Hydroelectric 64.3 (2012 est.)
 Nuclear: 0% (2012 est.)
 Other: 0% (2012 est.)
 Electricity production: 127.6 billion kWh (2012 est.)
 Electricity – consumption: 85.05 billion kWh (2011 est.)
 Electricity – exports: 633 million kWh (2009 est.)
 Electricity – imports: 260 million kWh (2009 est.)
 Electricity – installed generating capacity: 27.5 million kW (2012 est.)

Statistics

Economy data 

The Macroeconomic Stabilization Fund (FIEM) decreased from US$2.59 billion in January 2003 to US$700 million in October, but central bank-held international reserves actually increased from US$11.31 billion in January to US$19.67 billion in October 2003. On the black market, the bolívar fell 28% in 2007 to Bs. 4,750 per US$ and declined to around VEF 5.5 (Bs 5500) per US$ in early 2009.

The economy recovered and grew by 16.8% in 2004. This growth occurred across a wide range of sectors—the oil industry directly provides only a small percentage of employment in the country. International reserves grew to US$27 billion. Polling firm Datanalysis noted that real income in the poorest sectors of society grew by 33% in 2004.

On 7 March 2007, the government announced that the Venezuelan bolívar would be redenominated at a ratio of 1 to 1,000 at the beginning of 2008 and renamed the bolívar fuerte ("strong bolivar") to ease accounting and transactions. This was carried out on 1 January 2008, at which time the exchange rate was 2.15 bolívar fuerte per US$. The ISO 4217 code for the bolívar fuerte is VEF.

Government spending as a percentage of GDP in Venezuela in 2007 was 30%, smaller than other mixed economies such as France (49%) and Sweden (52%). According to official sources from the United Nations, the percentage of people below the national poverty line has decreased during the presidency of Hugo Chávez, from 48.1% in 2002 to 28% in 2008.

With the 2007 rise in oil prices and rising government expenditures, Venezuela's economy grew by 9% in 2007. Oil prices fell starting in July 2008, resulting in a major loss of income. Hit by a global recession, the economy contracted by 2% in the second quarter of 2009, contracting a further 4.5% in the third quarter of 2009. Chavez's response has been that these standards mis-state economic fact and that the economy should be measured by socialistic standards. On 17 November, the Central Bank reported that private sector activity declined by 4.5% and that inflation was averaging 26.7%. Compounding such problems is a drought which the government says was caused by El Niño, resulting in rationing of water and electricity and a short supply of food.

The year 2010 saw Venezuela still in recession as GDP has fallen by 5.8% in the first quarter of 2010. The Central Bank of Venezuela has stated that the recession is due largely "to restricted access to foreign currency for imports, lower internal demand and electricity rationing". The oil sector's performance was also particularly troubling, with oil GDP shrinking by 5%. More importantly, the Central Bank hints at the root cause of the oil contraction, saying that "the bank said it was due to falls in production, "operative problems", maintenance stoppages and the channeling of diesel to run thermal generators during a power crisis". While the public sector of the economy has fallen 2.8%, the private sector has dropped off 6%.

The year 2013 proved to be difficult for Venezuela as shortages of necessities and extreme inflation attacked the nation's economy. Items became so scarce that nearly one quarter of items were not in stock. The bolívar was devalued to 6.3 per US$ in early 2013 taking one third of its value away. However, inflation still continued to rise drastically in the country to the point President Maduro forced stores to sell their items just days before elections. Maduro said that the stores were charging unreasonable prices even though the owners were only charging so much due to the actual devaluation of the bolívar.

In 2014 The Central Bank of Venezuela stopped releasing statistics for the first time in its history as a way to possibly manipulate the image of the economy. Venezuela has also dismantled CADIVI, a government body in charge of currency exchange.

In May 2019, the Central Bank of Venezuela released economic data for the first time since 2015. According to this release, the inflation of Venezuela was 274% in 2016, 863% in 2017 and 130,060% in 2018. The new reports imply a contraction of more than half of the economy in five years, according to the Financial Times "one of the biggest contractions in Latin American history". According two undisclosed sources from Reuters, the release of this numbers was due to pressure from China, a Maduro ally. One of this sources claims that the disclosure of economic numbers may bring Venezuela into compliance with the IMF, making it harder to support Juan Guaidó during the presidential crisis. At the time, the IMF was not able to support the validity of the data as they had not been able to contact the authorities.

The following table shows the main economic indicators in 1980–2021 (with IMF staff estimates in 2022–2023). Inflation below 10% is in green.

Currency black market 

The parallel exchange rate is what Venezuelans believe the Venezuelan currency is worth compared to the US$. In the first few years of Chávez's office, his newly created social programs required large payments in order to make the desired changes. On 5 February 2003, the government created CADIVI, a currency control board charged with handling foreign exchange procedures. Its creation was to control capital flight by placing limits on individuals and only offering them so much of a foreign currency. This limit to foreign currency led to a creation of a currency black market economy since Venezuelan merchants rely on foreign goods that require payments with reliable foreign currencies. As Venezuela printed more money for their social programs, the bolívar continued to devalue for Venezuelan citizens and merchants since the government held the majority of the more reliable currencies.

As of January 2018, the strongest official exchange rate was 1 US$ to 10 VEF while the free market exchange rate was over 200,000 VEF to 1 US$. Since merchants can only receive so much necessary foreign currency from the government, they must resort to the black market which in turn raises the merchant's prices on consumers. The high rates in the black market make it difficult for businesses to purchase necessary goods since the government often forces these businesses to make price cuts. This leads to businesses selling their goods and making a low profit, such as Venezuelan McDonald's franchises offering a Big Mac meal for only $1. Since businesses make low profits, this leads to shortages since they are unable to import the goods that Venezuela is reliant on. Venezuela's largest food producing company, Empresas Polar, has stated that they may need to suspend some production for nearly the entire year of 2014 since they owe foreign suppliers $463 million. The last report of shortages in Venezuela showed that 22.4% of necessary goods are not in stock. This was the last report by the government since the central bank no longer posts the scarcity index. This has led to speculation that the government is hiding its inability to control the economy which may create doubt about future economic data released.

Socioeconomic indicators 

Like most Latin American countries, Venezuela has an unequal distribution of wealth. Although distribution improved when the surplus of rural labor started to diminish and the educational system improved in the middle of the 20th century, equality is far from coinciding with western standards. The rich tend to be very rich and the poor very poor. In 1970, the poorest fifth of the population had 3% of national income while the wealthiest fifth had 54%. For comparison, the United Kingdom 1973 figures were 6.3% and 38.8% and the United States in 1972, 4.5% and 42.8%.

The more recent income distribution data available is for distribution per capita, not per household. The two are not strictly comparable because poor households tend to have more members than rich households, thus the per household data tends to show less inequality than the per capita data. The table below shows the available per capita data for recent years from the World Bank.

Poverty in Venezuela increased during the 1980s and early 1990s, but it decreased greatly in the mid to late 1990s. The decreasing trend continued through the Chávez presidency, with the exception of the troubled years 2002 and 2003. Under the Bolivarian government, poverty decreased initially when Venezuela acquired oil funds, though poverty began to increase to its highest level in decades in the 2010s.

The table below shows the percentage of people and the percentage of households whose income is below a poverty line which is equal to the price of a market basket of necessities such as food.

Social development 
In the early 2000s when oil prices soared and offered Chávez funds not seen since the beginning of Venezuela's economic collapse in the 1980s, Chávez's government became "semi-authoritarian and hyper-populist" and consolidated its power over the economy in order to gain control of large amounts of resources. Domestically, Chávez used such oil funds for populist policies, creating the Bolivarian missions, aimed at providing public services to improve economic, cultural and social conditions. From 1999 to 2009, 60% of government revenues focused on social programs while social investment went from 8.4% of GDP in 1988 to 18.8% in 2008. Despite warnings near the beginning of Chávez's tenure in the early 2000s, Chávez's government continuously overspent in social spending and did not save enough money for any future economic turmoil, which Venezuela faced shortly before and after his death. On the year of Chávez's death, Venezuela was still categorized as having high human development on its Human Development Index in 2013 according to the United Nations Development Programme, although human development began to decline in Venezuela within a year, with the country dropping 10 ranks by 2014.

Poverty and hunger 
Extreme poverty and lack of food and medicines has pushed more than three million Venezuelans to leave the country in recent years. Andres Bello Catholic University conducted a study of poverty that found the poorest 20% of Venezuelans had 1.4% of the nation's wealth, down from 3.4% in 2014, while the richest 10% had 61% of the nation's wealth, up from 30%.

According to government figures released in April 2017, 1,446 children under the age of 1 died in 2016, representing a 30 percent increase in one year. As of August 2017, 31 million people suffered from severe food shortages. The ENCOVI universities survey found that 73% of Venezuelans said they had lost 9 kg (19 lbs) of body weight in 2016 and 64% had lost 11 kg (25 lbs) in 2017.

When the country's economy collapsed in 2014, hunger and malnutrition became a severe problem. In 2015, close to 45% of Venezuelans said they were unable to afford food at times. In 2018, this figure rose to 79%, one of the highest rates in the world.

Although poverty initially declined under Chávez, Venezuela's poverty rate increased to 28% by 2013, with extreme poverty rates increasing 4.4% to 10% according to the Venezuelan government's INE. Estimates of poverty by the United Nations Economic Commission for Latin America and the Caribbean (ECLAC) and Luis Pedro España, a sociologist at the Universidad Católica Andrés Bello, showed an increase of poverty in Venezuela. ECLAC showed a 2013 poverty rate of 32% while Pedro España calculated a 2015 rate of 48%. The Venezuelan government estimated that 33% were in poverty in the first half of 2015 and then stopped producing statistics. According to Venezuelan NGO PROVEA, by the end of 2015 there would be the same number of Venezuelans living in poverty as there was in 2000, reversing the advancements against poverty by Chávez. The ENCOVI annual survey by three universities estimated poverty at 48% in 2014, 82% in 2016 and 87% in 2017.

In relation to hunger, under-nutrition, undernourishment and the percentage of children under the age of five who are moderately or severely underweight decreased earlier in Chávez's tenure. However, shortages in Venezuela as a result of price control policies left the majority of Venezuelans without adequate products after his death.

Education 

The total net enrollment ratio in primary education for both sexes increased from 87% in 1999 to 93.9% in 2009. The primary completion rate for both sexes reached 95.1% in 2009 as compared to 80.8% in 1991. The literacy rates of 15- to 24-year-olds in 2007, for men and women, were 98% and 98.8%, respectively. During the Bolivarian diaspora, a large percentage of the millions of Venezuelans who left the country were highly educated, resulting in a brain drain in the country.

Since starting in 2003, the free government program Mission Robinson had taught more than 2.3 million people to read and write as of 2012. The program also focused much of its attention on reaching out to geographically isolated and historically excluded members of the population, including indigenous groups and Afro-descendants. In 2008, Francisco Rodríguez of Wesleyan University in Connecticut and Daniel Ortega of IESA stated that there was "little evidence" of "statistically distinguishable effect on Venezuelan illiteracy" during the Chávez administration. The Venezuelan government claimed that it had taught 1.5 million Venezuelans to read, but the study found that "only 1.1m were illiterate to begin with" and that the illiteracy reduction of less than 100,000 can be attributed to adults that were elderly and died.

Health care 

Following the Bolivarian Revolution and the establishment of the Bolivarian government, initial healthcare practices were promising with the installation of a free healthcare system parallel to the existing national public health system, with the assistance received from Cuban medical professionals providing aid. The Bolivarian government's failure to concentrate on healthcare for Venezuelans, the reduction of healthcare spending and government corruption eventually affected medical practices in Venezuela, causing avoidable deaths along with an emigration of medical professionals to other countries.

Venezuela's reliance on imported goods and its complicated exchange rates initiated under Chávez led to increasing shortages during the late-2000s and into the 2010s that affected the availability of medicines and medical equipment in the country. The United Nations reported an increase in the maternal mortality ratio, which increased from 93 per 100,000 in 1990 to 110 per 100,000 in 2013. Following shortages of many medical and common goods in 2014, Venezuelan women have had difficulties accessing contraceptives and were forced to change prescriptions or search several stores and the Internet for their medications. Shortage of antiretroviral medicines to treat HIV/AIDS affected about 50,000 Venezuelans in 2014 as well, potentially causing thousands of Venezuelans with HIV to develop AIDS.

Venezuela is also the only country in Latin America where the incidence of malaria is increasing, allegedly due to illegal mining. In 2013, Venezuela registered the highest number of cases of malaria in the past 50 years, with 300 of 100,000 Venezuelans being infected with the disease.

Technology 
In 1990, the number of Internet users in Venezuela was minimal, but 35.63% of Venezuelans were Internet users by 2010. In fact, the number of Internet subscribers has increased sixfold. Programs such as the National Technological Literacy Plan, which provides free software and computers to schools, have assisted Venezuela in meeting this goal. However, several experts state that the poor infrastructure in Venezuela had created a poor quality of Internet in Venezuela, which has one of the slowest Internet speeds in the world. The lack of US$ due to the Venezuelan governments currency controls has also damaged Internet services because technological equipment must be imported into Venezuela.

The number of fixed telephone lines per 100 inhabitants was 7.56 in 1990. The number increased to 24.44 in 2010. In 2000, 2,535,966 Venezuelans had landline telephones. By 2009, this had increased to 6,866,626.

The Bolivarian government has also launched an aerospace program in cooperation with the People's Republic of China who built and launched two satellites that are currently in orbit—a communications satellite called Simón Bolívar and a remote sensing satellite called Miranda. In July 2014, President Maduro announced that a third satellite would be built by Chinese–Venezuelan bilateral cooperation.

See also 

 1980–1989 world oil market chronology
 2010s oil glut
 List of Latin American and Caribbean countries by GDP (nominal)
 List of Latin American and Caribbean countries by GDP (PPP)
 List of Venezuelan companies
 List of banks in Venezuela
 List of Venezuelan cooperatives
 Venezuela and the International Monetary Fund

Notes

References

External links 

 
Webarchive template wayback links
Venezuela
Venezuela
Articles containing video clips